Nissing or Nissang is a town near Karnal, Haryana (India) on Karnal-Kaithal highway.

Cities and towns in Karnal district
Karnal